Córdoba is a city in central Argentina, in the foothills of the Sierras Chicas on the Suquía River, about  northwest of Buenos Aires. It is the capital of Córdoba Province and the second most populous city in Argentina after Buenos Aires, with about 1.3 million inhabitants according to the 2010 census. It was founded on 6 July 1573 by Jerónimo Luis de Cabrera, who named it after Córdoba, Spain. It was one of the early Spanish colonial capitals of the region that is now Argentina (the oldest city is Santiago del Estero, founded in 1553). The National University of Córdoba is the oldest university of the country. It was founded in 1613 by the Jesuit Order. Because of this, Córdoba earned the nickname La Docta ("the learned").

Córdoba has many historical monuments preserved from Spanish colonial rule, especially buildings of the Catholic Church. The most recognizable is perhaps the Jesuit Block (Spanish: Manzana Jesuítica), declared in 2000 as a World Heritage Site by UNESCO which consists of a group of buildings dating from the 17th century, including the Colegio Nacional de Monserrat and the colonial university campus. The campus belongs today to the historical museum of the National University of Córdoba, which has been the second-largest university in the country since the early 20th century (after the University of Buenos Aires), in number of students, faculty, and academic programs. Córdoba is also known for its historical movements, such as Cordobazo and La Reforma del '18 (known as University Revolution in English).

History

Early settlements

In 1570 the Viceroy of Peru, Francisco de Toledo, entrusted the Spanish settler Jerónimo Luis de Cabrera with the task of founding and populating a settlement in the Punilla Valley. Cabrera sent an expedition of 48 men to the territory of the Comechingones. He divided the principal column that entered through the north of the provincial territory at Villa María.
The expedition of one hundred men set foot on what today is Córdoba on 24 June 1573. Cabrera called the nearby river San Juan (today Suquía). The settlement was officially founded on 6 July of the same year and named , possibly in honour of ancestors of the founder's wife, who originally came from Córdoba, Spain. The foundation of the city took place on the left bank of the river on the advice of Francisco de Torres.

The area was inhabited by  aboriginal people called Comechingones, who lived in communities called ayllus. After four years, having repelled attacks by the aborigines, the settlement's authorities moved it to the opposite bank of the Suquía River in 1577. The Lieutenant Governor at the time, Don Lorenzo Suárez de Figueroa, planned the first layout of the city as a grid of 70 blocks. Once the city core had been moved to its current location, the population stabilized. The city's economy blossomed due to trade with the cities in the north.

In 1599, the religious order of the Jesuits arrived in the settlement. They established a Novitiate in 1608 and, in 1610, the Colegio Maximo, which became the University of Córdoba in 1613 (today National University of Córdoba), the fourth-oldest in the Americas. The local  Jesuit church remains one of the oldest buildings in South America and contains the Monserrat Secondary School, a church, and residential buildings. To maintain such a project, the Jesuits operated five  Reducciones in the surrounding fertile valleys, including Caroya, Jesús María, Santa Catalina, Alta Gracia and Candelaria.

The farm and the complex (started in 1615, had to be vacated by the Jesuits following the 1767 decree by King Charles III of Spain that expelled the Jesuit order from the continent. Franciscans then operated the Jesuits' foundations until 1853, when the Jesuits returned to the Americas. Nevertheless, the university and the high-school were nationalized a year later.
Each estancia has its own church and set of buildings, around which towns grew, such as Alta Gracia, the closest to the Block.

Early European settlement

In 1776, King Carlos III created the Viceroyalty of the Río de la Plata, in which Córdoba stays in 1785 as the Government Intendency of Córdoba, including the current territories of the provinces of Córdoba, La Rioja and the region of Cuyo.

According to the 1760 census, the population of the city was 22,000 inhabitants. During the May Revolution in 1810, the widespread opinion of the most notable citizens was of continuing respecting the orders of Fernando VII, attitude assumed by the local authorities, which led to the Liniers Counter-revolution. This position was not shared by the Dean Gregorio Funes, who was adhering to the revolutionary ideas, beside supporting contact with Manuel Belgrano and Juan José Castelli.

In March 1816, the Argentine Congress met in Tucumán for an independence resolution. Córdoba sent Eduardo Pérez Bulnes, Jerónimo Salguero de Cabrera, José Antonio Cabrera, and to the Canon of the cathedral Michael Calixto of the Circle, all of them of autonomous position.

The 1820s belonged to caudillos, since the country was in full process of formation. Until 1820 a central government taken root in Buenos Aires existed, but the remaining thirteen provinces felt that after 9 July 1816 what had happened it was simply a change of commander. The Battle of Cepeda pitted the commanders of the Littoral against the inland forces.

Finally, the Federales obtained the victory, for what the country remained since then integrated by 13 autonomous provinces, on the national government having been dissolved.
From this way the period known like about the Provincial Autonomies began. From this moment the provinces tried to create a federal system that was integrating them without coming to good port, this mainly for the regional differences of every province.

Two Córdoba figures stood out in this period: Governor Juan Bautista Bustos, who was an official of the Army of the North and in 1820 was supervised by the troops quartered in Arequito, a town near Córdoba, and his ally and later enemy, General José María Paz. In 1821, Bustos repelled the invasion of Córdoba on the part of Francisco Ramírez and his Chilean ally, General José Miguel Carrera. The conflict originated in a dispute with the power system that included the provinces of Buenos Aires, Córdoba and Santa Fe; according to the 1822 census the total population of Córdoba was of 11,552 inhabitants.

Contemporary history

At the end of the 19th century the process of national industrialization began with the height of the economic agro-exporting model, principally of meats and cereals. This process is associated with the European immigration who began to settle the city, generally possessing the education and enterprising capacity appropriate for the development of industry. The majority of these European immigrants came from Italy (initially from Piedmont, Veneto and Lombardy; later from Campania and Calabria), and Spain (mostly Galicians and Basques)

At the beginning of the 20th century the city had 90,000 inhabitants.  The city's physiognomy changed considerably following the construction of new avenues, walks and public squares, as well as the installation of an electrified tram system, in 1909. In 1918, Córdoba was the epicentre of a movement known as the University Reform, which then spread to the rest of the Universities of the country, Americas and Spain. 

The development of the domestic market, the British investments that facilitated European settlement, the development of the railways on the pampas rapidly industrialized the city. Córdoba's industrial sector first developed from the need to transform raw materials such as leather, meats and wool for export.

In 1927, the Military Aircraft Manufacturer (FMA) was inaugurated. The facility would become one of the most important in the world after World War II with the arrival of German technical personnel. From 1952, its production began to diversify, to constitute the base of the former Institute Aerotécnico, the state-owned company Aeronautical and Mechanical Industries of the State (IAME). Córdoba was chosen as the site of The Instituto Aerotécnico that later became the Fábrica Militar de Aviones. It employed the Focke Wulf men until President Juan Perón was ousted by a coup in 1955. Lockheed Martin purchased FMA in 1995.

Córdoba, according to the census of 1947, had almost 400,000 inhabitants (a quarter of the province's total). Subsequent industrial development led thousands of rural families to the city, doubling its population and turning Córdoba into the second largest city in Argentina, after Buenos Aires, by 1970. The city's population and economic growth moderated, afterwards, though living standards rose with the increase in the national consumption of Córdoba's industrial products, as well as the development of other sectors of economic activity. 

At times rivaling Buenos Aires for its importance in national politics, Córdoba was the site of the initial mutiny leading to the 1955 Revolución Libertadora that deposed President Juan Perón and the setting for the 1969 Cordobazo, a series of violent labor and student protests that ultimately led to elections in 1973. Córdoba's current economic diversity is due to a vigorous services sector and the demand for agro-industrial and railway equipment and, in particular, the introduction of U.S. and European automakers after 1954.

Geography 

The city, adjoins in the northern territory with Colón Department summarizing a total surface of 562.

Geology
The city is located in the plain of the Humid Pampa, to the east of the oriental cord of Córdoba Hills or Sierras Chicas, also known as the Sierras Cordobesas, which has an average height of 550 m. It spreads at the foot of the mount, on both banks of the River Suquía, and flows into the San Roque reservoir; from there, the Primero River goes east into the plains surrounding the city of Córdoba.

Once inside the city, the La Cañada stream meets the Rio Primero near the city centre area. Two kilometers to the east, Isla de los Patos (Ducks Island) was repopulated with ducks and swans in the 1980s. It was reported in March 2006 that a large number of ducks had died due to unspecified causes. Pollution caused by chemical waste is suspected as the cause, but avian influenza is also being investigated.

Beyond the city limits, the river flows towards the Algarrobos swamp and ends its course on the southern coast of the Mar Chiquita (or Mar de Ansenuza) salt lake.

Pollution of the water and of the riverbank is a major environmental issue in Córdoba.  Periodic cleaning operations are carried out to increase the quality of the water and to preserve the viability of fishing, both in the San Roque reservoir area and downstream.

Climate 
The climate of the city of Córdoba, and that of most of the province, is humid subtropical (Cwa, according to the Köppen climate classification), moderated by the Pampas winds, cold winds that blow from the South-western quadrant, which originate in Antarctica.

There are four marked seasons.

By late February or early March, nights start getting cooler and, in March, highs average  and lows ; after cold fronts, lows below  and highs below  are recorded in this month.
April is significantly drier already; highs reach  on average and lows , creating very pleasant conditions.
May usually brings the first frosts, and very dry weather, with under  of rain expected. Highs average  and lows average ; however, when cold waves reach the area, highs may stay below  and lows can be well below freezing.

Snowfall is very rare in the city, but more frequent in the outskirts where the Sierras begin ; sleet may fall every once in a while.

It is not unusual to see temperatures drop  from one day to another, or to have frost following extreme heat. Drought is most common in this season, when the normal summer rainfall arrives later than expected.

The wealthier suburbs west of the city are located at slightly higher altitudes, which allows cool breezes to blow in the summer, bringing drier, comfortable nights during hotter periods, and more regular frost in the winter. Generally speaking, Córdoba's daytime temperatures are very slightly warmer than Buenos Aires' but nighttime lows are usually cooler, especially in the winter. This, combined with a lower humidity and the possibility of fleeing to higher altitudes minutes away from the city centre, makes the climate a bit more comfortable than in the capital.

The variations or thermal extents are greater than in Buenos Aires, and lower in annual rainfall:  / year. The annual average temperature calculated during the 20th century was 18 °C. In January, the hottest month of the austral summer, the average maximum is 31 °C and the minimum 17 °C.
In July, the coldest month of the year, the average temperatures are between 19 °C and 3 °C.
In winter it is very frequent that temperatures rise above 30 °C, due to the influence of the wind Zonda.

Due to the extension of the metropolitan area, there exists a difference of 5 °C between the central area and the Greater Córdoba. The central district, a dense high-rise area is located in a depression, and it is the core of an important heat island. In addition the city presents a phenomenon of smog, but not so dense as to present health concerns.

Demographics

Ethnicity 
The largest ethnic groups in Córdoba are Italians/Italian Argentine and Spaniards/Spanish Argentine (mostly Galicians and Basques/Basque Argentine). Waves of immigrants from other European countries arrived in the late 19th and early 20th centuries. From the rest of Western Europe came immigrants from Switzerland, Germany, United Kingdom, Ireland and Scandinavia (especially Sweden). Other Europeans also arrived from nations such as Croatia, Poland, Hungary, Russia, Romania, Ukraine, Armenia and the Balkans (especially Greece, Serbia and Montenegro). By the 1910s, 43 percent of the city population was non-native Argentine after immigration rates peaked. Important Lebanese, Georgian, Syrian and Armenian communities have had a significant presence in commerce and civic life since the beginning of the 20th century.

Most immigrants, regardless of origin, settled in the city or around Greater Córdoba. However, in the early stages of immigration, some formed settlements (especially agricultural settlements) in different parts of the city, often encouraged by the Argentine government and/or sponsored by private individuals and organizations.

Demographic distribution 
Córdoba is the second largest city in the country in population and concentrates 40.9% of the Córdoba Province population of 3,216,993 inhabitants and represents almost 3.3% of the Argentine population, which according to estimates to June 2008, reached 39,745,613 inhabitants. Driven by migration both domestic and from abroad, the city's rate of population growth was an elevated 3.2% annually from 1914 to 1960; but, it has been declining steadily since then, and has averaged around 0.4% a year, since the national census of 2001.

According to the last provincial census of 2008, the city has 1,315,540 inhabitants, representing an increase of 3.78% with regard to the 1,267,521 registered during the national census of 2001.
Greater Córdoba is the metropolitan area of the city of Córdoba, a union of medium localities of the department Colón, from the north to the south. Greater Córdoba is the second-largest urban agglomeration in Argentina in both population and surface area.

The city receives a constant flow of students from the northeastern and southwestern regions of Argentina and of other South American countries, owed principally to the National University of Córdoba, which increases gradually the city population. Córdoba grows constantly, expanding especially towards the southern areas of Alta Gracia and Villa Carlos Paz.

Urban structure 

The use of the city soil is regulated by the municipality, which determines and destines 26,177 hectares to urban area (40.24%), 12,267 hectares to the industrial dominant area (21.3%), 16,404 hectares to rural area dominant (28.45%) and 5,750 hectares to other uses as military proposes, or institutional spaces (9.98%) of the total area of the city.

Green spaces include different types of spaces, from squares, small squares, up to urban, green linear parks of different scales as the river Suquia, bicycle pathways and highways). The surface supported by the Municipality of Córdoba in character of green Urban adds approximately 1645 hectares. 

The historical centre is shaped by quadrangular blocks of some hundred thirty meters of side. The disposition of the neighborhoods and principal avenues is radial. From the city centre district large avenues that lead to the most peripheral neighborhoods are born. In conformity with the demographic growth the city has expanded principally to the northwest and to the southeast, following the trace of the National Route 9.
 
The governor, Juan Schiaretti, finalized the Circunvalaciónon 6 July 2019, by building the last 2,8 km from La Cañanada to Fuerza Aerea. This ended the construction of the 47 km long ring road motorway, which takes almost 34 minutes to complete.

Districts

Córdoba is home to one of the most important financial districts in South America. The district is home to the Bank of Córdoba and other private banking institutions. Sightseeing places include San Martín Square, the Jesuit Block (declared UNESCO World Heritage Site) and the Genaro Pérez Museum. The streets mostly follow a regular checkerboard pattern, and the main thoroughfares are Vélez Sarsfield, Colón, General Paz, Dean Funes Avenue, and 27 April Street. The point of origin of the city is the San Martin Square, surrounded by the Municipality and Central Post Office.

Downtown Córdoba is home of large shopping malls, notably Patio Olmos. This mall is the result of a massive regeneration effort, recycling and refurbishing the west side old warehouses into elegant offices and commercial centres. An important cultural point of interest is the Palacio Ferreyra, a mansion built in 1916 based on plans by the French architect, Ernest Sanson. The Ferreyra palace was converted into the Evita Perón Museum of Fine Arts (the city's second) in 2007. Located at the corner of Hipólito Yrigoyen and Chacabuco Avenues, it has now been restored and adapted to house the city's principal art gallery.

New Córdoba has a number of important avenues such as Yrigoyen and Vélez Sarsfield. Most of the university students in this growing city live in this neighbourhood, and a recent construction boom has been transforming this upscale area into the fastest-growing section in the city.

Ciudad Universitaria is a district located in the southern area of the city, next to the  Sarmiento Park, the city's most important one. The Universidad Nacional de Córdoba (UNC) has most of its facilities in this area. The UNC was the first university built in Argentina, founded by Jesuits around 1622. The Universidad Nacional de Córdoba is also famous for the "Reforma Universitaria", a student-led protest that started in March 1918 in the Medical School, in which the students rebelled against the prevailing university system. This was an old anachronistic system in which professors were authoritarian and inefficient, with a religiously oriented curriculum. Eventually this revolt lead to a more secular curriculum and some significant re-structuring of the university government. The distinctive nature of the movement derived not only from its radical demands, but also from its extremist tactics, the level of sophistication of its organization, and its major continental impact. In fact, the Reform Movement rapidly spread from Córdoba to Lima (1919), Cuzco (1920), Santiago de Chile (1920), and Mexico (1921). Another important university, the UTN, dedicated to the teaching of engineering sciences, is located in this part of the city. There are also a gym and football stadium and tennis courts for the students. The Córdoba Zoo is located in this district.

This very affluent neighborhood is famous for its schools, shops and educational institutions. This neighborhood's economic activity centers around the Rafael Núñez Avenue, a long wide road that stretches for a few kilometers and has restaurants, boutiques, banks and other shops. Over the last decade, this neighborhood has experienced steady growth; however, some of its most affluent inhabitants have moved to gated communities for security reasons. Some of these communities, such as "Las Delicias" and "Lomas de los Carolinos", are in the old Camino a La Calera.

Transportation 
The Córdoba public transport system includes trains, buses, trolleybuses and taxis. Long-distance buses reach most cities and towns throughout the country. Many residents own and drive the city’s official car, the Chrysler Cordoba.

The city is served by the nation's third-largest airport, Ingeniero Ambrosio L.V. Taravella International Airport.

Buses 
Buses are, by far, the most popular way of transportation around Córdoba Province. There are many different companies that provide long distance, short distance and urban services. They all have their own prices, that are not cheap compared to the rest of Argentina. Córdoba is one of the Provinces with higher transportation rates. Urban buses used to be paid with a card called RedBus

Railway

Rail transport in Córdoba has commuter and long-distance services, all operated by state-owned Trenes Argentinos. From the Mitre railway station depart trains to Villa María while the Tren de las Sierras connects the district of Alta Córdoba with Cosquín.

From Retiro station of Buenos Aires trains reach Córdoba twice a week with an estimated journey time of 18 hours. Many people choose the train because of the low cost, but it takes almost twice the time that would take to do the same trip by bus (around eight hours).

The Tren de las Sierras is a tourist service that crosses part of the Valle de Punilla, Quebrada del Río Suquía and borders the Dique San Roque's Lake. It has two services per day with an additional service on weekends. It takes between 2 and 3 hours to go from Alta Córdoba Station to Cosquín.

Córdoba has two railway stations, the Córdoba (Mitre) originally built by the Central Argentine R. in 1886. That station has been an intermediate stop for trains to Tucumán, successively operated by Ferrocarriles Argentinos and then by private consortiums such as Ferrocentral. The other station is Alta Córdoba, built and operated by British-owned Córdoba North Western in 1891, and currently terminus of Tren de las Sierras.

Railway stations in the city of Córdoba are:

High-speed rail project

The Argentine government had projected to build a high-speed train between Buenos Aires-Rosario-Córdoba. Originally scheduled to be started in 2008, with its inauguration in 2010, the project was finally dismissed in December 2012. The total cost of the rail had been estimated at US$4,000,000,000. French company Alstom, that had won the tender to build high-speed rail, admitted to have paid bribes to the Argentine authorities.

Metro

On 10 December 2007 it was announced that a consortium of Iecsa/Gela companies was to build a US$1.1 billion metro system in Córdoba. In April 2008, President Cristina Fernández de Kirchner, signed the project into law. The project has been suspended since 2012.

Córdoba Public Transportation statistics
The average amount of time people spend commuting with public transit in Córdoba, for example to and from work, on a weekday is 64 min. 13.8% of public transit riders, ride for more than two hours every day. The average amount of time people wait at a stop or station for public transit is 21 min, while 43.% of riders wait for over 20 minutes on average every day. The average distance people usually ride in a single trip with public transit is 5 km, while 4% travel for over 12 km in a single direction.

Economy

Since World War II, Córdoba has been developing a versatile industrial base. The biggest sectors is car and car parts manufacturing: Renault has a factory which produces a range of cars and Volkswagen has a factory specialized in the production of gearboxes. The capital goods company CNH Industrial has also a factory in the city. Many suppliers (both local and foreign) manufacture car parts for these operations. Additionally, starting in 2017–2018, Nissan and Mercedes-Benz will begin the production of their new pickup truck at the Renault factory. Railway construction (Materfer) and aircraft construction (Fábrica Militar de Aviones) were once significant employers, but their activities have greatly diminished. Furthermore, there are some textile, heavy and chemical industries (e.g. Porta for alcohol).

Areas around Córdoba produce vast amounts of agricultural products, and some of these are processed around the city. Additionally, the province is one of the main producers of agricultural machinery in the country, although most of these operations are not in the city itself. Candy company Arcor is headquartered in the city.

Córdoba has been considered the technological centre of Argentina. The Argentine spaceport (Centro Espacial Teófilo Tabanera), where satellites are being developed and operated for CONAE, is located in the suburb of Falda del Carmen. The software and electronic industries are advancing and becoming significant exporters; among the leading local employers in the sector are Motorola, Vates, Intel, Electronic Data Systems, and Santex América.

The city also has a service-based economy focused on retail, professional services and financial services, where the main local player is credit card provider Tarjeta Naranja. It has recently emerged as a start-up hub with a growing number of angel investors, in part due to the availability of people with technology-oriented skills.

Sports
Association football is the most popular sport in Córdoba as well as in Argentina. Several leagues and divisions compete in the local championship annually. The city currently has one representative in the Argentine First Division, Talleres. Other lower-division sides in Córdoba include Belgrano, Instituto de Córdoba and Racing de Córdoba.

Basketball is the second-most popular sport in Córdoba. Asociación Deportiva Atenas is the most popular club, and one of the most successful in Argentina, having won the National League (LNB) seven times, and being three times winner of the South American League. Córdoba was one of the host cities of the official Basketball World Cup for its 1967 and 1990 editions.

Rugby union is also a very popular sport in Córdoba, which has close to 20 teams with many divisions. Tala Rugby Club, Club La Tablada, Córdoba Athletic Club (one of the oldest clubs in Argentina and founded by the British who worked in the building of the Argentine Railroads around 1882), Jockey Club Córdoba, and Club Universitario de Córdoba are some of the most prestigious teams. Córdoba is one of the strongest rugby places in Argentina, and is the home of many international players. Many of the great players in Argentina and Italy began their careers in the Córdoba's rugby clubs.

Golf and tennis are also very popular; notable players that started playing in Córdoba include Ángel "Pato" Cabrera and Eduardo "Gato" Romero (b. 1954) in golf and David Nalbandian in tennis.

The Argentine stage of the World Rally Championship has been run near Córdoba since 1984.
Motorsport events also take place at Autódromo Oscar Cabalén, such as TC2000 but has hosted Stock Car Brasil and Formula Truck.

Education 

Córdoba has long been one of Argentina's main educational centers, with 6 universities and several postsecondary colleges. Students from the entire country, as well as neighbouring countries attend the local universities, giving the city a distinct atmosphere.

The National University of Córdoba, established since 1613, is the 4th oldest in the Americas and the first in Argentina. It has about 105,000 students, and offers degrees in a wide variety of subjects in the sciences, applied sciences, social sciences, humanities and arts.

The Córdoba Regional Faculty is a branch of the National Technological University in Córdoba, offering undergraduate degrees in engineering (civil, electrical, electronic, industrial, mechanical, metallurgy, chemical and information), as well as master's degrees in engineering and business, and a PhD program in engineering and materials.

The Catholic University of Córdoba is the oldest private university in Córdoba, it has nearly 10,000 students.

The Aeronautic University Institute, run by the Argentine Air Force, offers degrees in aeronautical, telecommunications and electronic engineering, as well as information systems, accounting, logistics and administration.

The Instituto Tecnológico Córdoba was created jointly by the six universities located in the city to support technological development in the region.

Furthermore, the Universidad Siglo 21 and Universidad Blas Pascal are private universities in the city.

The Air Force Academy and the Air Force NCOs School are both located in the city outskirts.

There is an Italian international school, Escuela Dante Alighieri.

The area once had a German school, Deutsche Schule Cordoba.

Culture

Literature
The Literary activity flourished in the city at the beginning of the last century. Córdoba was the city of Leopoldo Lugones, Arturo Capdevila and Marcos Aguinis, among many other prestigious writers. Among the city's best-known museums are the Caraffa Fine Arts Museum, founded in 1916, and the Evita Fine Arts Museum, founded in 2007. The Paseo del Buen Pastor, a cultural center opened in 2007, features an art museum, as well as a shopping gallery devoted to local vintners, cheese makers, leather crafters and other artisans.

Music
The typical music in Córdoba is the cuarteto, heard in many parties and pubs. Among the most popular cuarteto singers are Carlos La Mona Jiménez (b. 1951), Rodrigo, La Barra and Jean Carlos. The places they usually sing are named bailes (dances). One of the first groups was Cuarteto de Oro.

Other music styles popular with the youth are electronic music (or electro), as well as reggaeton. These are commonly played at boliches, as night clubs are known in Argentina. Córdoba is sometimes referred to as "the nightlife city" (or "the city that never sleeps"), because of its wide range of clubs and teenage matinées (dancing clubs).

Córdoba's rich musical culture also encompasses classical, jazz, rock and pop, in a variety of venues.

Teatro Libertador San Martín regularly features concerts, operas, folk music, and plays.

Monuments

Córdoba has many historical monuments left over from the colonial era. In the centre, near the Plaza San Martín square, is the Jesuit Cathedral, whose altar is made of stone and silver from Potosí. Every ornament inside is made of gold and the roof is all painted with different images from the Bible. Another important historic building is the Cabildo (colonial government house), located next to the church. The Jesuit Block, the Monserrat School, the University and the church of the Society of Jesus are also located in Córdoba.

In Nueva Córdoba, it is situated "Iglesia del Sagrado Corazón de Jesús", also known as "Los Cappuchinos". This is an example of Neo Gothic style.

Festivals
The first festival of the year is in February, the Carnival, where children enjoy throwing water balloons at each other on the street.

Then in the middle of the year, on 20 July, Friends Day is celebrated. Usually, most of the teenagers meet at Parque de las Naciones or Parque Sarmiento and spend the afternoon there. At night, they go dancing to different places, and enjoy a drink.

The last festival is Spring Day, held on 21 September, which is Students' Day. Many go to the park or spend the day in the nearby city of Villa Carlos Paz. There they can enjoy concerts, dancing, going downtown or visiting the river bank.

Notable people
 

José Luis Bartolilla (b.1986) , singer, songwriter and actor
Rodrigo Bueno (1973-2000), cuarteto composer
Ángel Cabrera (b. 1969), golf player
Paulo Dybala (b. 1993), football player
Don Fabian, bolero composer
Facundo Gambandé (b. 1990), actor and singer
Cristian Gastou (b. 1970), songwriter, producer and evangelical preacher
Luis Lima (b. 1948), operatic tenor
Paulo Londra (b. 1998), rapper
David Nalbandian (b. 1982), tennis player
Fabricio Oberto (b. 1975), basketball player
Luis Oliva (1908-2009), Olympic runner (1932, 1936)
Viviana Rivero (b. 1966), writer
Victor Saldaño (b. 1972), Texas death row inmate
Darío Zárate (b. 1977), football player
Lucas Zelarayán (b. 1992), football player (Armenia national team)
Vernon De Marco (b. 1992), football player (Slovak national team)

Gallery

Notes

References

External links

 
Populated places in Córdoba Province, Argentina
Capitals of Argentine provinces
Populated places established in 1573
World Heritage Sites in Argentina
Cities in Argentina
1573 establishments in the Spanish Empire
1573 establishments in South America
Argentina